Skihist Provincial Park is a provincial park in British Columbia, Canada, located on the Thompson River and adjacent to the Trans-Canada Highway #1 between the towns of Lytton (W) and Spences Bridge (E).  The park is named for Skihist Mountain, which is visible from the park though on the opposite side of the Fraser River to the west of Lytton.

History
Skihist Provincial Park was established in 1956 as a rest stop and overnight camping location along highway 1.

Facilities

Day-Use
Adjacent to the highway, a rest area with water and flush toilets is available. There are standard parking spots as well as trailer parking spots. The rest area closes for the winter season. The park is open from May to September.

Camping
Skihist Campground is located near the day-use area on the opposite side of Highway #1. It is open during the Summer season. There are 58 campsites.

References

External links 
http://www.env.gov.bc.ca/bcparks/explore/parkpgs/skihist/

Provincial parks of British Columbia
Thompson Country
Protected areas established in 1956
1956 establishments in British Columbia